Azizbeyov may refer to:
Mashadi Azizbeyov, Soviet revolutionary

Places named for Mashadi Azizbeyov:
Azizbeyov, Goranboy, a village in Azerbaijan
Azizbeyov, Goygol, a village in Azerbaijan

Places formerly called Azizbeyov:
Aregnadem, Armenia
Daylaqlı, a village and municipality in Azerbaijan
Khazar raion, a raion (district) in Azerbaijan
Vayk, Armenia
Zaritap, Armenia